Dawn at Socorro is a 1954 American Western film directed by George Sherman and starring Rory Calhoun and Piper Laurie. It was produced and distributed by Universal Pictures. The film is set mostly in Lordsburg, New Mexico, and the spoken introduction says the story is based on an actual shootout in the town in 1871. But no such incident happened there. The plot is actually a thinly veiled fictionalization of the famous 1881 shootout near the OK Corral in Tombstone, Arizona, which pitted the Earp brothers and Doc Holliday against the Clanton Gang.

Plot
A retired gunfighter (Rory Calhoun) and a saloonkeeper (David Brian) play cards, with the saloon and a dance-hall girl (Piper Laurie) at stake.

Cast
 Rory Calhoun as Brett Wade
 Piper Laurie as Rannah Hayes
 David Brian as Dick Braden
 Kathleen Hughes as Clare
 Alex Nicol as Jimmy Rapp
 Edgar Buchanan as Sheriff Cauthen 
 Mara Corday as Letty Diamond
 Roy Roberts as Doc Jameson
 Skip Homeier as Buddy Ferris
 James Millican as Harry McNair
 Lee Van Cleef as Earl Ferris
 Stanley Andrews Old Man Ferris
 Richard Garland as Tom Ferris
 Scott Lee as Vince McNair
 Paul Brinegar as Desk Clerk
 Philo McCullough as Rancher (as Philo McCollough)
 Forrest Taylor as Jebb Hayes

See also
 List of American films of 1954

External links
 
 
 

1954 films
Films directed by George Sherman
American Western (genre) films
1950s English-language films
1954 Western (genre) films
Films set in New Mexico
Universal Pictures films
1950s American films